Love Remains The Same is the Finnish rock band Von Hertzen Brothers's third full-length album. The album was released on 14 May 2008 in Finland and reached the number one position in the Finnish charts.

Track listing

"Bring Out the Sun (So Alive)" – 10:45
"Spanish 411" – 7:01
"Freedom Fighter" – 4:25
"Somewhere in the Middle" – 7:08
"In The End" – 6:08
"Faded Photographs" – 3:48
"Silver Lover" – 6:06
"I Came For You" – 7:19
"The Willing Victim" – 9:18

Personnel

Kie von Hertzen - Lead guitars, vocals, etc.
Mikko von Hertzen - Lead vocals, guitars, etc.
Jonne von Hertzen - Bass, vocals, etc.
Juha Kuoppala - Keyboards
Mikko Kaakkuriniemi - Drums and Percussion

See also
List of number-one albums of 2008 (Finland)

External links
 Von Hertzen Brothers on Myspace

2008 albums
Von Hertzen Brothers albums